Lind Point Fort, located northwest of Cruz Bay on Saint John, U.S. Virgin Islands, is a historic site which was listed on the National Register of Historic Places in 1981.

It was built by the British as a battery site, commanding Cruz Bay, during the Napoleonic Wars. The site includes a semi-circular earthwork ruin.  It is protected within a National Park.

References

National Register of Historic Places in Virgin Islands National Park
Buildings and structures completed in 1807